Pride Bristol is a not-for-profit organisation in Bristol, England, which works to promote LGBT equality in the south west, and organises a week-long pride festival in July each year. Their motto is "Celebrating Diversity, Championing Equality, Across the South West". 

Pride Bristol organised its first events when it was founded in 2010, including Bristol's first ever LGBT pride parade, showing the London Lesbian and Gay Film Festival at The Watershed, a show at The Bristol Hippodrome, a one-off performance by Rhona Cameron at Metropolis, and literary reviews by Stella Duffy and Paul Burston at the Arnolfini. Sonique performed as the headline act for the main Pride Day, alongside La Soirée's Le Gateau Chocolat, in a festival attended by more than 20,000 people, which was voted Bristol's best festival by Venue.

Pride Bristol 2011 ran from Saturday 9 to Sunday 17 July, and included shopping, theatre, film, art, literature, historical and a few sporting events. Pride Day itself was on Saturday 16 July, and included a parade through the city, and a festival in Castle Park with Kelis as the headline act, supported by Clare Maguire and opened by Peter Tatchell.

Since being established in 2010 Pride Bristol has returned each year, run by We Are Fest CIC, located in Bristol's Castle Park (though on College Green for 2011).

References

External links
  We Are Fest Website
 Bristol Pride Website

Festivals in Bristol
Pride parades in England